The 2002 WNBA season was the 6th season for the Cleveland Rockers.

Offseason

WNBA Draft

Regular season

Season standings

Season schedule

Player stats

References

Cleveland Rockers seasons
Cleveland
Cleveland Rockers